Les Hauts-de-Caux is a commune in the Seine-Maritime department in the Normandy region in northern France. It was established on 1 January 2019 by merger of the former communes of Autretot (the seat) and Veauville-lès-Baons.

Population

See also
Communes of the Seine-Maritime department

References

Communes of Seine-Maritime
2019 establishments in France